Sitora Hamidova (born 12 May 1989) is an Uzbekistani long-distance runner. She competed in the marathon at the 2015 World Championships and 2016 Olympics.

References

1989 births
Living people
People from Surxondaryo Region
Uzbekistani female long-distance runners
World Athletics Championships athletes for Uzbekistan
Athletes (track and field) at the 2016 Summer Olympics
Athletes (track and field) at the 2014 Asian Games
Athletes (track and field) at the 2018 Asian Games
Olympic athletes of Uzbekistan
Asian Games competitors for Uzbekistan
21st-century Uzbekistani women